Allen Springs is a group of mineral water springs in Lake County, California.
From 1874 the springs were surrounded by a resort with a hotel, cottages, saloon, store and so on. 
The resort was turned into a private club in 1912 and had been abandoned by 1940.
By 2021 the site had returned to nature.

Location

The Köppen climate classification is Csb : Warm-summer Mediterranean climate.

Springs

There are many strong springs in the bed and side of the creek.

The water was alkaline and was turbid from iron in suspension.

A 1914 description gave different names to the springs.
It listed the main springs and their temperatures as White Sulphur, ; Soda, ; Soda and Iron (three springs) ; and Allen (at the club house), .

History

The springs were discovered by Europeans in 1871.
They were first acquired by a Mr. Allen. 
A resort was founded in 1874.
The Allen Springs Post Office operated from 1874 to 1906.
The resort grew to include a hotel, cottages, dance hall, store, stable and other facilities.
An 1877 report in the Weekly Colusa Sun, said,

An advertisement from 1880 described Allen Springs as "A fine summer resort for tourists and invalids. There are found iron springs, white sulphur spring and cold fresh water springs that are unsurpassed on the Pacific coast. The route from Sacramento and San Francisco is by railroad to Williams, thence by stage (daily) 40 miles over a romantic mountain road."
Water from the Allen spring was bottled for sale.

James D. Bailey bought the springs in January 1881.
As of 1881 there was a daily line of stages from Lakeport to the west via Upper Lake, and from Williams to the east.
There were 21 guest cottages.
There was also a large dancing hall.
The water was claimed to be good for kidney affections, dyspepsia, rheumatism, dropsy, general debility, skin diseases, female complaints, ague, paralysis and erysipelas.
The hotel contained facilities for mail, express delivery and telegrams.

Early in the 20th century high waters one winter washed away some of the cottages and the resort was closed.
It was reopened in the summer of 1910 with the hotel building and several cottages.
As of 1911 water that was formerly bottled, which came from a spring on the steep canyon side opposite the hotel, was piped across the creek to a drinking shed.
As of 1914 four or five of the springs had cemented curbs.
The springs, which had formerly been a resort, were operated by the private Allen Springs Club of Woodland for exclusive use of members and guests.

The resort had been abandoned by 1940.
A real estate advertisement in 2021 for part of the resort said "Creek is running & nature has taken over".

Notes

References

Sources

 

Resorts in Lake County, California
Springs of Lake County, California